Hasya Kala Drama Group is a Hindi and Sindhi language theater group that is based in Dubai, United Arab Emirates. It was started by play writer, director and producer, Narendra Sadhwani with the idea of promoting amateurs and motivating local talent to exhibit their acting skills. 'Hasya' is a Sanskrit word for 'laughter' and 'Kala' means 'art' in Hindi.

Since its inception on October 21, 1992, the group has entertained its audience with a genre of suspense comedy and has successfully staged 21 well received dramas at various locations in Dubai.

The group has more than 80 members, including actors, on and off-stage coordinators and volunteers. Mrs. Geeta Sadhwani plays a vital role in managing the group and oversees its rehearsal activities.

Promoting the Sindhi Language

In 2002, the group staged its first full length Sindhi drama. By 2006, four Sindhi dramas were staged. This was highly appraised by the Sindhi Ceremonial Center, Dubai, which presented shields to all the artists on 23 April 2006 for their memorable performance and hard work in the third sindhi drama, Hiku Ajeebu Khel BLACKMAIL. The center also honored the writer, director, producer and founder of the group by presenting him with a Certificate towards his contribution in promoting the “Sindhi” language and also working for the cause of Sindhi community.

Celebrating 25 years
The group celebrated its twenty five years of success on October 21, 2017.

List of Dramas

Hindi Dramas

Sindhi Dramas

Fusion Dramas

References

External links
 Dil Ki Chot Pyaar Ka Vote - First Hindi Drama by Hasya Kala Drama Group, Dubai
 Virasat Mein Hirasat - Second Hindi Drama by Hasya Kala Drama Group, Dubai
 Laila Ki Daud... Majnu Ki Oar - Third Hindi Drama by Hasya Kala Drama Group, Dubai
 Ek Ajeeb Khel BLACKMAIL - Fourth Hindi Drama by Hasya Kala Drama Group, Dubai
 Virasat Mein Hirasat - Fifth Hindi Drama by Hasya Kala Drama Group, Dubai
 Seedhe Raaste Tedhi Chaal - Sixth Hindi Drama by Hasya Kala Drama Group, Dubai
 Seedhe Raaste Tedhi Chaal - Seventh Hindi Drama by Hasya Kala Drama Group, Dubai
 Aish Without... Cash - Eighth Hindi Drama by Hasya Kala Drama Group, Dubai
 Manju Ta Manju... Na Ta Ta Vanju - First Sindhi Drama by Hasya Kala Drama Group, Dubai
 Virasaata Mein Hirasaata - Second Sindhi Drama by Hasya Kala Drama Group, Dubai
 Hiku Ajeebu Khel BLACKMAIL - Third Sindhi Drama by Hasya Kala Drama Group, Dubai
 Dill Ji Chot... Pyaarra Jo Vote - Fourth Sindhi Drama by Hasya Kala Drama Group, Dubai

Theatre companies in the United Arab Emirates